The Somaliland campaign, also called the Anglo-Somali War or the Dervish War, was a series of military expeditions that took place between 1900 and 1920 in modern-day Somalia. The British were assisted in their offensives by the Ethiopians and Italians. During the First World War (1914–1918), the Dervish leader Mohammed Abdullah Hassan received support for a time, from the Emperor Iyasu V of Ethiopia, he was also sent a letter of support by the Ottomans though it was intercepted by Italian agents in Aden and may never have reached him. The conflict ended when the British aerially bombed the Dervish capital of Taleh in February 1920.

Background

British Somaliland

Although nominally part of the Ottoman Empire, Yemen and the sahil (including Zeila) came progressively under the control of Muhammad Ali, ruler of Egypt, between 1821 and 1841. After the Egyptians withdrew from the Yemeni seaboard in 1841, Haj Ali Shermerki, a successful and ambitious Somali merchant, purchased from them executive rights over Zeila. Shermerki's governorship had an instant effect on the city, as he manoeuvred to monopolize as much of the regional trade as possible, with his sights set as far as Harar and the Ogaden. Shermerki was later succeeded as Governor of Zeila by Abu Bakr Pasha, a local Afar statesman.

In 1874–75, the Egyptians obtained a firman from the Ottomans by which they secured claims over the city. At the same time, the Egyptians received British recognition of their nominal jurisdiction as far east as Cape Guardafui. In practice, however, Egypt had little authority over the interior and their period of rule on the coast was brief, lasting only a few years (1870–84).

The British Somaliland protectorate was subsequently established in the late 1880s after the ruling Somali authorities signed a series of protection treaties granting the British access to their territories on the northwestern coast. Among the Somali signatories were the Gadabuursi (1884), Habar Awal (1884 and 1886), and Warsangali.

When the Egyptian garrison in Harar was eventually evacuated in 1885, Zeila became caught up in the competition between the Tadjoura-based French and the British for control of the strategic Gulf of Aden littoral. By the end of 1885, the two powers were on the brink of armed confrontation, but opted instead to negotiate. On 1 February 1888 they signed a convention defining the border between French Somaliland and British Somaliland.

Italian Somaliland

The Majeerteen Sultanate within the northeastern part of the Somali territories was established in the mid-18th century and rose to prominence the following century, under the reign of the resourceful Boqor (King) Osman Mahamuud.

In late December 1888, Yusuf Ali Kenadid, the founder and first ruler of the Sultanate of Hobyo, requested Italian protection, and a treaty to that effect was signed in February 1889, making Hobyo an Italian protectorate. In April, Yusuf's uncle and rival, Boqor Osman, requested a protectorate from the Italians and was granted it. Both Boqor Osman and Sultan Kenadid had entered into the protectorate treaties to advance their own expansionist goals, with Sultan Kenadid looking to use Italy's support in his ongoing power struggle with Boqor Osman over the Majeerteen Sultanate, as well as in a separate conflict with the Sultan of Zanzibar over an area to the north of Warsheikh. In signing the agreements, the rulers also hoped to exploit the rival objectives of the European imperial powers so as to more effectively assure the continued independence of their territories. The terms of each treaty specified that Italy was to steer clear of any interference in the sultanates' respective administrations.

In return for Italian arms and an annual subsidy, the Sultans conceded to a minimum of oversight and economic concessions. The Italians also agreed to dispatch a few ambassadors to promote both the sultanates' and their own interests. The new protectorates were thereafter managed by Vincenzo Filonardi through a chartered company. An Anglo-Italian border protocol was later signed on 5 May 1894, followed by an agreement in 1906 between Cavalier Pestalozza and General Swaine acknowledging that Baran fell under the Majeerteen Sultanate's administration.

Campaigns

1900–02
The first offensive campaign was led by the Haroun against Ethiopian encampment at Jijiga in March 1900. The Ethiopian general Gerazmatch Bante reportedly repulsed the attack and inflicted great losses on the Dervishes, although the British vice-consul at Harar claimed the Ethiopians out of pride armed even children with rifles to inflate the size of their forces. The Haroun seized control of the Ogaden but did not attack Harar. Instead, he raided the non-Dervish Qadariyyah clans for their camels and arms.

In 1901, the British joined with the Ethiopians and attacked the Dervishes with a force 17,000 strong. The Haroun was driven across the border into the Majeerteen Sultanate, which had been incorporated into the Italian protectorate. The Ethiopians failed to get a hold on the western Ogaden and the British were eventually forced to retreat, having accomplished none of their goals. In this campaign, "borders were ignored by both British and Somali."

Lt-Col. Alexander Cobbe of 1st (Central Africa) Battalion, King's African Rifles, was awarded the Victoria Cross for his action at Erego, on 6 October 1902.

February–June 1903

The British became convinced of their need of Italian assistance, but memories of the disastrous Battle of Adowa inhibited any Italian fervour for action in the Horn of Africa. In 1903, the Italian Foreign Ministry permitted the British to land forces at Hobyo (Obbia). An Italian naval commander off Hobyo feared "that the expedition will end in a fiasco; the Mad Mullah will become a myth for the British, who will never come across him, and a serious worry for ... our sphere of influence."

The relationship between Hobyo and Italy soured when Sultan Kenadid refused the Italians' proposal to allow British troops to disembark in his Sultanate so that they might then pursue their battle against  Diiriye Guure's Dervish forces. Viewed as too much of a threat by the Italians, Kenadid was exiled first to the British-controlled Aden Protectorate, and then to Italian Eritrea, as was his son Ali Yusuf, the heir apparent to his throne. In May, the British Foreign Office realised the error, and had Kenadid's son appointed regent, just in time to forestall an attack in Mudug by the Sultan's army.

The expedition ended in failure soon after. The Haroun annihilated a British detachment near Gumburru and then forced another Daratoleh back to base. For trying to save a fellow officer during the fighting withdrawal three officers John Gough, George Rolland, William George Walker were awarded Victoria Crosses. With 1,200–1,500 rifles, 4,000 ponies and some spearmen, he occupied the Nugal Valley from Halin in the British protectorate to Ilig (or Illig) on the Italian-held coast. The main British force near Galad (Galadi) under General William Manning retreated north along the line Bohotleh–Burao–Sheekh. This "old-established line" had already been breached by the Haroun when they invaded the Nugal. By the end of June, the withdrawal was complete.

January–May 1904

After the failure of General Manning's offensive, General Charles Egerton was entrusted with a response. Following extensive preparations, he united his field force at Bacaadweeyn (Badwein) on 9 January 1904 and defeated the Haroun at Jidballi the next day. The British and their allies from Hobyo harassed the Haroun along their retreat, and  lost many of his camels and livestock throughout February.

In early March, the second phase of operations began. The Ethiopians advanced as far as Gerlogubi but turned back in early April. The Italian Navy bombarded Ilig in the winter to no effect. On 16 April, three ships of the East Indies Station under Rear Admiral George Atkinson-Willes left Berbera planning to capture Ilig in cooperation with an advance overland. The attack on Ilig took place on 21 April. A Royal Naval detachment, reinforced by three companies of the Royal Hampshire Regiment, stormed and captured the forts at Illig, the ships' guns supporting the attack. The British lost 3 men killed and 11 wounded, and the Dervishes 58 killed and 14 wounded. The naval detachment remained ashore for four days, assisted by an Italian naval detachment that arrived on 22 April. Control of Ilig was finally relinquished to Ali Yusuf of Hobyo. Having defeated his forces in the field and forced his retreat, the British "offered the Mullah safe conduct into permanent exile at Mecca"; the Haroun did not reply.

1920

Following the end of World War I, British troops once again turned their attention to the disturbances in British Somaliland. The Dervishes had previously defeated British forces at the Battle of Dul Madoba in 1913. Four subsequent British expeditions against Hassan and his soldiers had also failed.

In 1920, British forces launched a final campaign against Hassan's Dervishes. Although the majority of the combat took place in January of the year, British troops had begun preparations for the assault as early as November 1919. The British forces were led by the Royal Air Force and the ground component included the Somaliland Camel Corps. After three weeks of battle, the Dervishes were finally defeated, bringing an effective end to their 20-year resistance.

Notes

References

Articles
 Clifford, E. H. M. (1936). "The British Somaliland–Ethiopia Boundary." The Geographical Journal 87 (4): 289–302.
 Cunliffe-Owen, Frederick. (1905). "The Somaliland Operations: June, 1903, to May, 1904." Royal United Service Institution Journal 49 (1): 169–83.
 Galbraith, John S. (1970). "Italy, the British East Africa Company, and the Benadir Coast, 1888–1893." The Journal of Modern History 42 (4): 549–63.
 Gray, Randal. (1970). "Bombing the ‘Mad Mullah’ – 1920." Royal United Service Institution Journal 25 (4): 41–47.
 Hess, Robert L. (1964). "The ‘Mad Mullah’ and Northern Somalia." The Journal of African History 5 (3): 415–33.
 Lane, Paul G. (June 2020). "The capture of the forts at Illig from the Mad Mullah, 21 April 1904." Orders & Medals Research Society Journal 59 (2): 152–156.
 Latham Brown, D. J. (1956). "The Ethiopia–Somaliland Frontier Dispute." The International and Comparative Law Quarterly 5 (2): 245–64.
 Ravenstein, E. G. (1894). "The Recent Territorial Arrangements in Africa." The Geographical Journal 4 (1): 54–58.

Books
 
 
 
 
 
 
 
 
 
 
 

1900s in Somalia
1910s in Somalia
1920s in Somalia
1900s conflicts
1910s conflicts
1920s conflicts
Military campaigns involving the United Kingdom
Battles involving the princely states of India
Proxy wars
Wars involving Somaliland
African theatre of World War I
African resistance to colonialism
Resistance to the British Empire